The Los Angeles Dodgers Radio Network is a network that consists of 27 radio stations that air Major League Baseball games of the Los Angeles Dodgers in parts of seven states and one U.S. territory and in three languages. , 20 stations broadcast games in English, while another six broadcast them in Spanish. In 2013, Korean broadcasts were added, making it the only tri-lingual network in Major League Baseball.

English

The primary English-language radio broadcasts are handled by Charley Steiner and Tim Neverett on play-by-play and Rick Monday on color commentary. Until his 2016 retirement, Vin Scully's television play-by-play for SportsNet LA (previously Prime Ticket) was simulcast during the first three innings of games that he called (primarily home games, and away games in California and Arizona). Steiner and Monday called the entire game on radio during games that were nationally televised. For locally televised road games that Scully did not call, Steiner handled the TV commentary with Orel Hershiser and Nomar Garciaparra on color commentary, while Monday called play-by-play on radio with Kevin Kennedy doing color. During the post-season, Scully called the first and last three innings solo, with Steiner and Monday calling the middle innings. 

Scully retired on October 2, 2016; his commentary was simulcast on radio for the entire game.

California

Indiana

Nevada

New Mexico

Texas

U.S. Virgin Islands

Spanish
A separate network airs games in Spanish. Jaime Jarrín has been the Spanish play-by-play voice of the Dodgers since 1959. His oldest son, Jorge Jarrín, is also the play-by-play announcer replacing Pepe Yniguez and Fernando Valenzuela who are now on Spectrum SportsNet LA's Spanish-language channel.

California

New Mexico

Korean

In 2013, the Dodgers announced that 60 games would be aired in Korean on KMPC AM 1540. Richard Choi does play-by-play while Chong Ho Yim does color commentary. As of 2014, selected Dodger games are broadcast on AM 1540, while all games are broadcast in Korean on the Second Audio Program of Spectrum SportsNet LA.

See also
 List of XM Satellite Radio channels
 List of Sirius Satellite Radio stations

References

Los Angeles Dodgers
Major League Baseball on the radio
Mass media in Los Angeles County, California
Sports radio networks in the United States